Coole may refer to:

 Coole River, a tributary of the Marne river, France
 Coole, Marne, a commune in the Marne department, France
 Coole, County Westmeath, a village in Ireland
 Coole, County Cork, a village and civil parish in Ireland
 Coole, County Antrim, a townland in County Antrim, Northern Ireland
 Coole, County Tyrone, a townland in County Tyrone, Northern Ireland
 Coole (barony), a barony in County Fermanagh, Northern Ireland
 The Wild Swans at Coole, a poem by W.B. Yeats

See also